Kuala Sungai Baru is a mukim and town in Alor Gajah District, Malacca, Malaysia, with fishing as main economic activity. It is situated midway between Kuala Linggi and Pengkalan Balak and is approximately 15 kilometers from Masjid Tanah.

Education

Infrastructures

Tourist attractions

Gallery

See also
 List of cities and towns in Malaysia by population

References

Mukims of Malacca